Sand Draw is a  long second-order tributary to Bone Creek in Brown County, Nebraska.

Watershed

See also

List of rivers of Nebraska

References

Rivers of Brown County, Nebraska
Rivers of Nebraska